Koonsville is a former town that is now a section of Union Township, Luzerne County, Pennsylvania. It is approximately one mile outside Shickshinny along Route 239 and McKendree Road. Its elevation is approximately 616 feet (188 m).

It was formerly known as Arch Bridge, named for the stone bridge crossing Shickshinny Creek. It served as a logging community until the Battle of Wyoming in 1778, when most of the white settlers fled their homes, fearing Iroquois raids. Several farmers and loggers returned a few years later to rebuild, including Shadrick Austin, who bought  of land and, in 1801, established the Austin Family Inn.

Upon the establishment of the post office in 1850, the area was renamed and incorporated as Koonsville after William Koons, who was the first postmaster. The post office was decommissioned at the beginning of World War II, and Koonsville is now serviced by the Shickshinny post office.

In 1850, William Koons moved to the area and occupied the Austin family inn.

References

Unincorporated communities in Luzerne County, Pennsylvania
Unincorporated communities in Pennsylvania